Johann Bernhard Bach (the younger; to distinguish him from an older family member with the same name) (24 November 1700 – 12 June 1743) was a nephew of Johann Sebastian Bach. He was a German composer and organist.

Johann Bernhard was born in and he died in Ohrdruf.  In 1721 he followed his father, Johann Christoph Bach, in the post of organist at St. Michael in Ohrdruf.

References

Sources
This article was translated from the German Wikipedia.

German male composers
German Baroque composers
German classical organists
German male organists
Johann Bernhard
1700 births
1743 deaths
18th-century classical composers
18th-century keyboardists
18th-century German composers
18th-century German male musicians
Male classical organists